54 Nude Honeys (Greatest Hits) is the first and only compilation album by the Japanese punk rock band 54 Nude Honeys, released on April 17, 2006, by Skydog International, a French punk label. It is also the group's final release. A limited pressing of the album was released with a bonus DVD of the group's three music videos and a live performance recorded at the CBGB punk club in New York.

Track listing

References

54 Nude Honeys albums
2006 compilation albums